Celestina Onyeka   (born 15 July 1984) was a female Nigerian football defender.

She was part of the Nigeria women's national football team  at the 2004 Summer Olympics. On club level she played for Pelican Stars.

See also
 Nigeria at the 2004 Summer Olympics

References

External links
http://www.nigerianelitesforum.com/ng/autographs-and-biographies/93082-biography-of-celestina-onyeka-footballer.html
FIFA.com
http://allafrica.com/stories/200408040539.html
http://www.socceramerica.com/article/5912/olympics-women39s-soccer-rosters.html?print

1984 births
Living people
Nigerian women's footballers
Place of birth missing (living people)
Footballers at the 2004 Summer Olympics
Olympic footballers of Nigeria
Women's association football defenders
Nigeria women's international footballers
Pelican Stars F.C. players
Igbo people